The meridian 141° west of Greenwich is a line of longitude that extends from the North Pole across the Arctic Ocean, North America, the Pacific Ocean, the Southern Ocean, and Antarctica to the South Pole.

The 141st meridian west forms a great circle with the 39th meridian east.

Most of the border between Alaska, United States and Yukon, Canada is defined by the meridian, meaning the western extremity of Canada lies on this meridian.

From Pole to Pole
Starting at the North Pole and heading south to the South Pole, the 141st meridian west passes through:

{| class="wikitable plainrowheaders"
! scope="col" width="130" | Co-ordinates
! scope="col" | Country, territory or sea
! scope="col" | Notes
|-
| style="background:#b0e0e6;" | 
! scope="row" style="background:#b0e0e6;" | Geographical North Pole in the Arctic Ocean
| style="background:#b0e0e6;" |
|-
| style="background:#b0e0e6;" | 
! scope="row" style="background:#b0e0e6;" | Beaufort Sea
| style="background:#b0e0e6;" |
|-valign="top"
| 
! scope="row" |  /  border
| Alaska / Yukon
|-
| 
! scope="row" | 
| Alaska (Yakutat City and Borough)
|-valign="top"
| style="background:#b0e0e6;" | 
! scope="row" style="background:#b0e0e6;" | Pacific Ocean
| style="background:#b0e0e6;" | Passing just west of Eiao island,  (at ) Passing just east of Napuka atoll,  (at ) Passing just west of Fangatau atoll,  (at ) Passing just west of Amanu atoll,  (at )
|-valign="top"
| 
! scope="row" | 
| Hao atoll
|-valign="top"
| style="background:#b0e0e6;" | 
! scope="row" style="background:#b0e0e6;" | Pacific Ocean
| style="background:#b0e0e6;" | Passing just west of Paraoa atoll,  (at ) Passing just east of Manuhangi atoll,  (at )
|-
| style="background:#b0e0e6;" | 
! scope="row" style="background:#b0e0e6;" | Southern Ocean
| style="background:#b0e0e6;" |
|-
| 
! scope="row" | Antarctica
| Unclaimed territory
|-
|}

See also
140th meridian west
142nd meridian west

References

w141 meridian west
Canada–United States border
Borders of Alaska
Borders of Yukon